The battle of Dewair (Dewar) was fought between Amar Singh I of Mewar and Mughal army led by Jahangir under Muhammad Parviz and Asaf Khan III. Shortly after his accession in 1606, Jahangir sent an army of 20,000 cavalry to attack Mewar. Parviz was only the figurative commander while in reality the de facto commander was Jahangir who directed Asaf Khan. Amar led a hard fought battle to defend his territory, and personally killed the Mughal commander Sultan Khan and his horse by spear which went through both. Reportedly, Asaf Khan retreated from the battlefield. Both Amar and Asaf Khan claimed victory in an indecisive battle.

See also 
Battle of Haldighati
Battle of Dewair (1582)

References

Sources

History of Rajasthan
Mewar dynasty
Dewair
Dewair
Dewair
Dewair